Cissites is a genus of blister beetles in the family Meloidae. There are at least four described species in Cissites.

Species
These four species belong to the genus Cissites:
 Cissites auriculata (Champion, 1892) (big-eared blister beetle)
 Cissites cephalotes (Olivier, 1795)
 Cissites maculata (Swederus, 1787)
 Cissites sasakii Kono, 1936

References

Further reading

External links

 

Meloidae
Articles created by Qbugbot